Baron Friedrich Caspar von Geismar (known in Russian as Fyodor Klementyevich Geismar, ; 1783-1848) was a German military officer who spent the best part of his career in the service of Imperial Russian Army. He eventually rose to the rank of Full General and became an adjutant to Nicholas I of Russia.

Biography 
He was born on  12 May 1783 in Ahlen into a noble family known since the 13th century. His father was a chamberlain at the court of the king of Prussia. He was an heir to the Dössel line of an old Austrian-German noble family of Geismar zu Riepen from the castle of Warburg. His parents were Baron Clemens August von Geismar, the commander of Guard Regiment of the kings of Prussia and Bernadina de Berswardt. 

On 2 August 1798, at the age of 15, he joined the Lower Austrian 4th Infantry Regiment "Hoch- und Deutschmeister". He served with his unit in the disastrous battle of Austerlitz, where his unit was destroyed by Napoleon Bonaparte. After the battle he joined Russian service and fought in the ranks of Russian Imperial Army during the French invasion of Russia.

After the Battle of Leipzig he was given command of a Cossack cavalry regiment and the task of escorting the ducal family back to Weimar where he defeated a French attack, for which the city of Weimar awarded him honorary citizenship. He joined a local masonic lodge in a ceremony that inspired Goethe to write his poem Creed. 

After the war he put down the Chernigov Regiment revolt of the Decembrists and, in the 1828 Turkish campaign, won a battle near Băilești. In 1830 his native town of Ahlen also awarded him with honorary citizenship. 

Later that year he fought against the November Uprising in Poland. In a series of defeats he lost most of his soldiers in the battles of Stoczek, Iganie and Wawer and considered suicide. Eventually he was given command over a new force and took part in the final Battle of Warsaw. During the struggle for Fort 54 (Ordon's Redoubt) he was severely wounded. 

After the Polish campaign he commanded the I Corps stationed in Wilno but was accused of conniving Konarski's revolutionary activities and forced into retirement. In 1842, he settled at his property in Podolia, the village of Gródek. He built several factories, churches, a school and a hospital for locals.

Geismar had many children from two marriages, first to a Romanian princess from the House of Ghika (whom he had met during the Turkish war and later divorced) and then to Herder's niece named Nathalie.

References 

Imperial Russian Army generals
Barons of Germany
Recipients of the Pour le Mérite (military class)
1783 births
1848 deaths